The  was an army of the Imperial Japanese Army during the Second Sino-Japanese War.

History
The Japanese 10th Army was formed on October 20, 1937 under the Imperial General Headquarters, and came under the control of the Japanese Central China Area Army on November 7 of the same year. It was an emergency reinforcement force to supplement the Japanese Shanghai Expeditionary Army in China after the Second Shanghai Incident. The Japanese 10th Army subsequently participated in the Battle of Nanjing and the subsequent atrocities known as the Nanking Massacre.  The unit was officially disbanded in Nanjing on February 14, 1938.

List of Commanders

References

External links

10
Military units and formations established in 1937
Military units and formations disestablished in 1938